The Taipei Metro Donghu station is located in the Neihu District in Taipei, Taiwan. It is a station on Wenhu line.

Station overview

This three-level, elevated station features two side platforms, three exits, and a platform elevator located on the north side of the concourse level. It is located on Kangning Road, Sec. 3.

The station is 83 meters long and 21.5 meters wide, while the platform is 93.5 meters long. Because of the station needed to go over the Wufen Road footbridge, the station height is 20 meters (the equivalent of a six-story building). It has thus been called the "Zenith Station" and is the highest station on the Taipei Metro.

Design
The station design theme is "Music". Surface designs in the station square represent a dancing musical staff. Silk fabric is printed on enamel slab art walls at the concourse level to represent romantic urban music.

Located next to the entrance, public art for the station is titled "The Rippling Lake". Porcelain and celadon are used to create ripples on the art piece.

History
December 2007: Station structure reaches completion.
22 February 2009: Donghu station construction is completed.
4 July 2009: Begins service with the opening of Brown Line.
The station is a planned transfer for the Minsheng–Xizhi line.

Station layout

Around the station
Ankang Park
Nanhu Senior High School
Minghu Junior High School
Nanhu Elementary School
Minghu Elementary School
Donghu Elementary School
Taipei Public Library, Donghu Branch
Donghu Police Station
Donghu Fire Department
Halar Cinemas

References

Wenhu line stations
Railway stations opened in 2009